
Polis is the ancient Greek concept of the city-state or body of citizens.

Polis may also refer to:

People
 Joel Polis (born 1951), American actor
 Jared Polis (born 1975), Colorado politician and entrepreneur

Places
 Polis, Albania, a village
 Polis, Cyprus, a town in Paphos District
 Polis, Crete, an early name of modern Argyroupoli, Rethymno
 Constantinople, colloquially referred to historically as Polis

Other uses
 Polis (journalism think tank)
 Polis (star), designated Mu Sagittarii Aa
 Polis (film), a 2014 American science fiction short
 Polis (album), by the French electronic artist Uppermost
 Polis Institute - The Jerusalem Institute of Languages and Humanities
 Polis, common name for the Turkish National Police
 Polis , common name for the  Swedish National Police

See also
 Police
 Polisen, the Swedish police